KLWB-FM (103.7 MHz) is a commercial FM radio station broadcasting a sports format.  Licensed to Carencro, Louisiana, it serves the Lafayette metropolitan area.  KLWB programming is also heard in the Lake Charles region of Louisiana, with a simulcast on KLCJ 104.1 FM.  The two stations carry CBS Sports Radio Network nights and weekends, as well as airing The Jim Rome Show middays.

KLWB-FM is owned by the Delta Media Corporation and calls itself "Southwest Louisiana's Sports Station."  KLWB's studios are on Evangeline Thruway in Carencro, and its transmitter is located northeast of Lafayette.

History
KLWB-FM signed on in May 2010, with its official launch coming on May 27.  The station's format originated as classic hits on sister station KXKW. That station - Mustang 87.7 - now airs a classic country format.

On June 1, 2012, KLWB-FM changed its format from classic rock (as "Snap 103.7) to sports radio, branded as "103.7 The Game".

On February 7, 2022, KLWB-FM began simulcasting on KLCJ 104.1 FM in Oak Grove.  The KLCJ simulcast brings KLWB's sports programming into the Lake Charles radio market.

References

External links

Radio stations in Louisiana
Sports radio stations in the United States
Radio stations established in 2010
Lafayette Parish, Louisiana
2010 establishments in Louisiana
CBS Sports Radio stations